Dylan Collins (born 1980) is an Irish software company founder and technology investor.

Collins was a co-founder in 2003 of the Actor gaming software start-up Demonware, which was sold to Activision in 2007.  In 2007, Collins went on to found Jolt Online which was sold to GameStop in 2009.

In 2013, Collins founded SuperAwesome, a company that builds infrastructure to manage and use the data of children on the internet, where he remains as CEO.  The company raised a $7 million investment in June 2015  and in 2017 it was reported by Sky News that the company had raised an additional £20m.  The company powers the parental consent requirement for many games oriented at kids such as Pokémon Go. Microsoft's investment arm M12 invested in the company in 2019 and it was acquired in 2020 by Epic Games for an undisclosed amount.

Collins is regularly quoted in the media around the application of Children's Online Privacy Protection Act (COPPA) to technology companies and the general concern of parental consent required for games and applications that target children. He has recommended media companies have a "Chief Children's Officer" to safeguard the privacy and concerns of children.

Collins is a graduate of Trinity College, Dublin, and he sits on the board of Irish television animation studio Brown Bag Films.

References 

Alumni of Trinity College Dublin
Living people
Irish businesspeople
1980 births